Samuel Almeida Braz Waterland Cruz (born 17 March 1993) is a Portuguese footballer who plays as a midfielder.

Football career
On 31 July 2013, he made his professional debut with Sporting Covilhã in a 2013–14 Taça da Liga match against Desportivo Chaves, replacing Diogo Gaspar (78th minute). In the first match of the  2013–14 Segunda Liga season against Marítimo B on the 11 August, he started the game and made his league debut.

References

External links

Stats and profile at LPFP

Samuel Cruz at ZeroZero

1993 births
Footballers from Porto
Living people
Portuguese footballers
Association football midfielders
S.C. Covilhã players
G.D. Tourizense players
Sport Benfica e Castelo Branco players
Liga Portugal 2 players